Hang Up Sorrow and Care is an album by Maddy Prior and the Carnival Band. Released in 1995, it is a loose concept album, with renditions of songs that were written hundreds of years ago.

Critical reception

Stereo Review stated: "Ballads and dances to the heart and the bottle are expertly played in a trad setting that features such instruments as lute, recorder, hoboy, curtal, kazoo, and 'ye great dooble bass'." The St. Louis Post-Dispatch deemed Hang Up Sorrow and Care "the most inspired drinking album of the digital era."

AllMusic wrote that "Maddy Prior and the Carnival Band have made a real party album, of witty, upbeat traditional songs from the British Isles."

Track listing 

Prodigal's Resolution (Anon 18th century)
5 Playford Tunes (from Playford's "English Dancing Master")
The World is Turned Upside Down (Anon 17th century)
Jovial Beggar (Anon 17th century)
Leathern Bottle (Anon 17th century)
Iantha (Anon English 18th century)
An Thou were my ain Thing (Anon Scottish 18th century)
Oh that I had but a Fine Man (Pelham Humphry)
Now O Now I needs must part (John Dowland)
Man is for the Woman made (Henry Purcell)
A Northern Catche/The Little Barleycorne (John Hilton/Trad)
Granny's Delight/My Lady Foster's Delight (Anon 18th century)
A Round of Three Country Dances in One (Thomas Ravenscroft)
Youth's the Season Made for Joys (Words: John Gay/Tune: anon)
In The Days of my Youth (Words: John Gay/Tune: anon)
Never weatherbeaten sail (Thomas Campion)
Old Simon the King (Anon)

Personnel 
Maddy Prior - vocals
William Badley - baroque guitar, lute, acoustic guitar, electric guitar, banjo mandolin, vocals
Andrew Davis - Double Bass
Giles Lewin - violin, recorders, hoboy, mandolin, vocals
Andrew Watts - Flemish bagpipes, shalman, curtals, recorders, melodica, kazoo, vocals
Rafaello Mizraki - drums, percussion, cello, Hammond organ, vocals
Arrangements by Andrew Watts

References

1995 albums
Maddy Prior albums